Mount Wellington is a mountain located to the north-east of Licola in Victoria, Australia. It is on the border of the Alpine National Park and Avon Wilderness Park. The Avon River rises on its south-eastern slopes.

The mountain is accessible via a seasonally-open four-wheel drive track that traverses the ridge line. Features along the track include Millers Hut (originally built in 1916), Taylors Lookout, The Sentinels, and Gable End. To the near west lies Lake Tali Karng.

Mount Wellington was named by Angus McMillan, who was also the first European to ascend the mountain. In November 1854, Victorian Government Botanist Ferdinand von Mueller climbed the mountain on the third of his three expeditions to the Victorian Alps, collecting many plants, including Alpine Wattle, Dwarf Buttercup and Lilac Berry.

See also

 Alpine National Park
 List of mountains in Victoria

References

Wellington
Alpine National Park